Acanthoderus is a monotypic genus of stick insects in the tribe Pachymorphini.  The single species Acanthoderus spinosus  has a known distribution in Australia.

From 1859 until 1875 the similar but unrelated Hoploclonia gecko was placed in the genus Acanthoderus.

References

External Links

Phasmatodea genera